Accident by Design is a 1950 detective novel by E.C.R. Lorac, the pen name of the British writer Edith Caroline Rivett. It is the thirty fourth in her long-running series featuring Chief Inspector MacDonald of Scotland Yard. Like a number of Lorac's works it takes the form of a country house mystery, a popular branch of the genre during the Golden Age of Detective Fiction. Maurice Richardson in an review in The Observer wrote "The usual carefully constructed, rural family murder case which we expect from this eminently trustworthy exponent of the English school of whodunnit."

Synopsis
Living in the grand Templedean Place in the Cotswolds, the Vanstead family are riven by mistrust and conflict. This is particularly directed towards the heir Gerald, returned from a Japanese internment camp in Malaya along with a brash Australian wife Muriel. When they died in a car crash, MacDonald has to investigate whether this was an accident or by deliberate intent.

References

Bibliography
 Cooper, John & Pike, B.A. Artists in Crime: An Illustrated Survey of Crime Fiction First Edition Dustwrappers, 1920-1970. Scolar Press, 1995.
 Hubin, Allen J. Crime Fiction, 1749-1980: A Comprehensive Bibliography. Garland Publishing, 1984.
 Nichols, Victoria & Thompson, Susan. Silk Stalkings: More Women Write of Murder. Scarecrow Press, 1998.
 Reilly, John M. Twentieth Century Crime & Mystery Writers. Springer, 2015.

1950 British novels
British mystery novels
Novels by E.C.R. Lorac
Novels set in England
British detective novels
Collins Crime Club books